The Known Unsoldier "Sick Of Waging War..." (also known simply as Sick Of Waging War) is the fourth mixtape in Sage Francis' "Sick of" mixtape series.

Track listing

References

Sage Francis albums
2002 compilation albums
Strange Famous Records compilation albums